Guahaioque was a minor deity in the religion of the Muisca. It was the god of evil, stealing, lies and death.

Etymology 
The name Guahaioque in the language of the Muisca, Muysccubun, means "figure of the deceased".
The name Guahaioque lives on as the name of a folk metal band from Cali.

See also 
 Muisca
 Muisca warfare
 Muisca religion

References 

Muisca gods
Pre-Columbian mythology and religion
Native American demons
Muysccubun